Mostafa Nagaty (born 5 April 1983) is an Egyptian fencer. He competed in the individual foil events at the 2008 Summer Olympics and 2004 Summer Olympics and in the team foil events at the 2004 Summer Olympics.

References

1982 births
Living people
Egyptian male foil fencers
Olympic fencers of Egypt
Fencers at the 2004 Summer Olympics
Fencers at the 2008 Summer Olympics
20th-century Egyptian people
21st-century Egyptian people